Eskander Bhouri (born 12 July 1997) is a Tunisian basketball player who currently plays for Club Africain.

He started his career with his hometown club US Monastir, where he played until signing for Club Africain in 2021.

National team career
Bhouri played with the Tunisia national under-19 team at the 2015 FIBA Under-19 World Championship.

BAL career statistics

|-
| style="text-align:left;"|2021
| style="text-align:left;"|US Monastir
| 3 || 0 || 4.0 || .000 || .000 ||– || .3 || 1.3 || .3 || .0 || .0
|-
|- class="sortbottom"
| style="text-align:center;" colspan="2"|Career
| 3 || 0 || 4.0 || .000 || .000 ||– || .3 || 1.3 || .3 || .0 || .0

References

External links

1997 births
Living people
Club Africain basketball players
Shooting guards
US Monastir basketball players
Tunisian men's basketball players
21st-century Tunisian people